Marko Rašo (born 25 July 1989) is a Croatian former professional footballer who played as a midfielder.

Club career
Rašo's debut for NK Zadar's senior squad was at the age of 17 in the second Croatian division (2.HNL) against Čakovec. In the first Croatian division (1.HNL) he debuted aged 18 in a match against Međimurje. His first league goal was away at Varteks. In the 2007–08 season when he was a still a youth he had six appearances and one goal and two assists. In 2008–09 he had 16 appearances with one goal and three assists.

On 1 February 2010, he signed a 2.5-year contract with Premier Liga Bosnia and Herzegovina team HŠK Zrinjski Mostar, the champion 2005, 2008. Six months later he joined FK Teplice. Later in 2012 he returned to Zadar and stayed until 1 January 2013. In January 2013 he signed a two-year contract with Lithuanian team FC Siauliai.

International career
Rašo had eight appearances for the Croatian national U-18 and U-19 team, and one goal in the home win against BIH 1–0.

References

External links
 

1989 births
Living people
Sportspeople from Zadar
Association football midfielders
Croatian footballers
Croatia youth international footballers
NK Zadar players
HNK Primorac Biograd na Moru players
HŠK Zrinjski Mostar players
FC Šiauliai players
First Football League (Croatia) players
Premier League of Bosnia and Herzegovina players
A Lyga players
Croatian expatriate footballers
Expatriate footballers in Bosnia and Herzegovina
Croatian expatriate sportspeople in Bosnia and Herzegovina
Expatriate footballers in Lithuania
Croatian expatriate sportspeople in Lithuania
Expatriate footballers in the Czech Republic
Croatian expatriate sportspeople in the Czech Republic